Return to Earth may refer to:
 Return to Earth (film), a 1976 American biopic TV movie
 Return to Earth (album), a 2006 album by Michale Graves
 Doctor Who: Return to Earth, a 2010 video game for the Nintendo Wii.